Ha Jung-eun (Hangul: 하정은; born 26 April 1987) is a women's and mixed doubles badminton player from South Korea. Ha was competed at the 2006, 2010 Asian Games, 2008 and 2012 Summer Olympics. Together with the Korean national women's team, they won the Uber Cup in 2010. At the same year, she won the bronze medal at the World Championships in the mixed doubles event.

Career 
Ha was competed at the 2004 World Junior Championships in Richmond, Canada, reached the semi finals round in the girs' singles and doubles event. At the 2004 and 2005 Asian Junior Championships, she achieved the best result by winning the 2005 mixed doubles title partnered with Lee Yong-dae. Ha junior was selected to join at the Korean national women's team, compete at the 2004 Uber Cup in Jakarta Indonesia. The team finished as the runner-up losing to China with the score 3–1.

In 2010, Ha with her women's doubles partner, Lee Kyung-won, became the semi-finalists in Korea Open Super Series, and with Ko Sung-hyun in the mixed event, they only reached the quarter-finals. In All England, Ha and Ko suffered a first-round defeat to Zheng Bo and Ma Jin of China 17–21 and 12–21. Meanwhile, Ha and Lee, seeded seventh, vanquished Indonesia's Shendy Puspa Irawati and Nitya Krishinda Maheswari in straight sets, 21–18 and 21–18, before bowing out to Chinese third seeds, Cheng Shu and Zhao Yunlei in the semi-finals.

The next week's tournament in Switzerland brought unsatisfying result for Ha and Ko as they lost to the eventual finalists and their countrymen, Shin Baek-cheol and Yoo Hyun-young, in a tough three-setter, 21–19, 9–21, 19–21. However, in the women's event, Ha and Lee succeeded to their third semi-final of 2010, edging fourth-seeded Petya Nedeltcheva and Anastasia Russkikh out with a 21–17 and 21–11 win. Ha and Lee fought hard in the semi-final but finally lost 21–13, 19–21, and 20–22 to Miyuki Maeda and Satoko Suetsuna of Japan. Ha played for the Korean Uber Cup team on May 9–16. She and Lee Kyung-won defeated Yu Yang and Du Jing of China in the final 19–21, 21–14, and 21–19, giving the first Uber Cup for Korea.

In 2011, Ha paired up with Lee Yong-dae again and they won the U.S. Open Grand Prix Gold title in July. In the women's doubles event, she also won the Grand Prix Gold title in Swiss, U.S., and Chinese Taipei partnered with Kim Min-jung. She and Kim was qualified at the Superseries Finals, and finished in the second place after losing a match to Wang Xiaoli and Yu Yang.

At the 2012 Summer Olympics,  Ha and her partner Kim Min-jung, along with Jung Kyung-eun and Kim Ha-na of South Korea, Wang Xiaoli and Yu Yang of China, and Meiliana Jauhari and Greysia Polii of Indonesia were disqualified from the competition for "not using one's best efforts to win a match" and "conducting oneself in a manner that is clearly abusive or detrimental to the sport" following matches the previous evening during which they were accused of trying to lose in order to manipulate the draw. Ha and her partner Kim Min-jung played against Indonesia's Meiliana Jauhari and Greysia Polii.  It is suspected that the Koreans emulated China so to avoid playing against another Korean team in the semi-finals; the Korean head coach Sung Han-kook said "Because they don't want to play the semi-final against each other, so we did the same. We didn't want to play the South Korean team again". South Korea filed an appeal to the case,  but it was rejected by the Badminton World Federation.

Achievements

BWF World Championships 
Mixed doubles

World Cup 
Women's doubles

Asian Games 
Women's doubles

Asian Championships 
Women's doubles

World Junior Championships 
Girls' singles

Girls' doubles

Asian Junior Championships 
Girls' doubles

Mixed doubles

BWF Superseries 
The BWF Superseries, launched on 14 December 2006 and implemented in 2007, is a series of elite badminton tournaments, sanctioned by Badminton World Federation (BWF). BWF Superseries has two level such as Superseries and Superseries Premier. A season of Superseries features twelve tournaments around the world, which introduced since 2011, with successful players invited to the Superseries Finals held at the year end.

Women's doubles

Mixed doubles

 BWF Superseries Finals tournament
 BWF Superseries Premier tournament
 BWF Superseries tournament

BWF Grand Prix 
The BWF Grand Prix has two levels, the Grand Prix Gold and Grand Prix. It is a series of badminton tournaments, sanctioned by the Badminton World Federation (BWF) since 2007. The World Badminton Grand Prix has been sanctioned by the International Badminton Federation since 1983.

Women's doubles

Mixed doubles

 BWF Grand Prix Gold tournament
 BWF & IBF tournament

BWF International Challenge/Series/Satellite
Women's singles

Women's doubles

Mixed doubles

 BWF International Challenge tournament
 BWF International Series tournament

References

External links 

 

1987 births
Living people
Sportspeople from Busan
South Korean female badminton players
Badminton players at the 2012 Summer Olympics
Badminton players at the 2008 Summer Olympics
Olympic badminton players of South Korea
Asian Games medalists in badminton
Asian Games bronze medalists for South Korea
Badminton players at the 2010 Asian Games
Badminton players at the 2006 Asian Games
Medalists at the 2006 Asian Games
Medalists at the 2010 Asian Games